"Back in the Saddle" is a song by American hard rock band Aerosmith.  It was written by Steven Tyler and Joe Perry.  It is the first track on Aerosmith's hard rock album Rocks released in 1976.  The song was also released as the third single from the album in 1977.  It peaked at #38 on the Billboard Hot 100.

Background
The song's main riff was written by Joe Perry on a Fender Bass VI, which gives the song its distinctive "growl".  Brad Whitford plays the lead guitar part.  "Back in the Saddle" also features one of the heaviest and most noticeable bass lines by Tom Hamilton.  The song is also notable for the slow buildup of the drum beat and guitar riff in the beginning of the song, as well as the sound effects of a galloping horse and whips, and screams and yodeling by Steven Tyler at the end of the song.  A real bullwhip was intended to be used for the whip effects and hours were spent trying to get it to crack.  The band members ended up cut up and hurt without making any progress.  Eventually, the band decided the whip effects would be created by whirling a 30-foot cord from the studio, then by firing a cap gun to create the crack of the whip (the sound effects are more prominent in the Quadraphonic mix of the album (Columbia CAQ 34165)).  When the song is performed in concert, Tyler often makes more noticeable lyrical and visible references to sex.  Although the lyrics, by Tyler, were written with the simple idea of cowboys and sex, this song took on new meaning after Aerosmith reunited in 1984 and embarked on their Back in the Saddle Tour.

Today, the song remains a staple on classic rock radio and in concert.  It is arguably one of the heaviest songs of Aerosmith's Top 40 singles, and is cited by rock musicians Slash and James Hetfield as among their favorite rock songs.

The "saddle" Tyler refers to in the song is metaphorical to several sexual positions.

Reception
Cash Box said that "many rhythmic changes, a great bass line and many devoted fans should carry this one in the same direction as 'Walk This Way'."  Record World called it "a powerful follow-up to their seething 'Walk This Way.'"

Cover versions
Sebastian Bach covered the song on his 2007 solo album Angel Down as a duet with Guns N' Roses frontman Axl Rose.

Mark Slaughter, Albert Lee, Rudy Sarzo and Frankie Banali covered the song for the Aerosmith tribute album Not the Same Old Song and Dance (Eagle Records, 1999). Additional guitars were by the album's producers, Bob Kulick and Bruce Bouillet.

In 2014 Aloe Blacc covered this song for the soundtrack for the film Need for Speed.

In other media
The song was used in the opening titles of NASCAR races on ESPN from 2007 to 2008.
In February 2009, Minority Whip Eric Cantor (R-VA) used Aerosmith's "Back in the Saddle" to boast in an ad that "The House GOP is back" due to the party's unanimous opposition in the house to the American Recovery and Reinvestment Act of 2009.  After Stage Three Music, which owns the rights to the song, asserted the use as copyright infringement, Cantor was forced to take down the ad.  Aerosmith also did not approve of its use and also wanted it taken down.
The song was used in the trailer as well as being prominently used in the 2010 action film Red.

References 

1976 songs
1977 singles
Aerosmith songs
Columbia Records singles
Song recordings produced by Jack Douglas (record producer)
Songs written by Joe Perry (musician)
Songs written by Steven Tyler
American heavy metal songs